Belgium competed at the 2007 World Championships in Athletics with 18 athletes.

Only one bronze medal was won by the Women's 4 × 100 m Relay team in a new National Record of 42.75. With this result, Belgium finished 36th in the Medal Table and 35th in the placing table.

Competitors

Results

Men

Women

External links
 Official website of the 2007 World Championships

Nations at the 2007 World Championships in Athletics
World Championships in Athletics
2007